Craig Lambert (born 5 October 1968) is a former Australian rules football player who played in the VFL/AFL between 1988 and 1993 for the Richmond Football Club and then from 1994 until 2000 for the Brisbane Bears then the  
Brisbane Lions Football Clubs. He is currently employed by the Greater Western Sydney Giants as a development coach.

Statistics

|-
|- style="background-color: #EAEAEA"
! scope="row" style="text-align:center" | 1988
|style="text-align:center;"|
| 53 || 21 || 4 || 11 || 204 || 222 || 426 || 35 || 46 || 0.2 || 0.5 || 9.7 || 10.6 || 20.3 || 1.7 || 2.2 || 10
|-
! scope="row" style="text-align:center" | 1989
|style="text-align:center;"|
| 4 || 20 || 7 || 12 || 247 || 226 || 473 || 49 || 40 || 0.4 || 0.6 || 12.4 || 11.3 || 23.7 || 2.5 || 2.0 || 4
|- style="background-color: #EAEAEA"
! scope="row" style="text-align:center" | 1990
|style="text-align:center;"|
| 4 || 19 || 4 || 11 || 208 || 205 || 413 || 37 || 32 || 0.2 || 0.6 || 10.9 || 10.8 || 21.7 || 1.9 || 1.7 || 6
|-
! scope="row" style="text-align:center" | 1991
|style="text-align:center;"|
| 4 || 22 || 18 || 10 || 262 || 320 || 582 || 75 || 50 || 0.8 || 0.5 || 11.9 || 14.5 || 26.5 || 3.4 || 2.3 || 4
|- style="background-color: #EAEAEA"
! scope="row" style="text-align:center" | 1992
|style="text-align:center;"|
| 4 || 21 || 15 || 13 || 236 || 256 || 492 || 38 || 39 || 0.7 || 0.6 || 11.2 || 12.2 || 23.4 || 1.8 || 1.9 || 4
|-
! scope="row" style="text-align:center" | 1993
|style="text-align:center;"|
| 4 || 20 || 5 || 5 || 203 || 259 || 462 || 33 || 43 || 0.3 || 0.3 || 10.2 || 13.0 || 23.1 || 1.7 || 2.2 || 2
|- style="background-color: #EAEAEA"
! scope="row" style="text-align:center" | 1994
|style="text-align:center;"|
| 18 || 19 || 7 || 5 || 179 || 279 || 458 || 21 || 59 || 0.4 || 0.3 || 9.4 || 14.7 || 24.1 || 1.1 || 3.1 || 9
|-
! scope="row" style="text-align:center" | 1995
|style="text-align:center;"|
| 18 || 10 || 2 || 3 || 99 || 150 || 249 || 19 || 27 || 0.2 || 0.3 || 9.9 || 15.0 || 24.9 || 1.9 || 2.7 || 0
|- style="background-color: #EAEAEA"
! scope="row" style="text-align:center" | 1996
|style="text-align:center;"|
| 18 || 20 || 10 || 8 || 228 || 295 || 523 || 39 || 62 || 0.5 || 0.4 || 11.4 || 14.8 || 26.2 || 2.0 || 3.1 || 9
|-
! scope="row" style="text-align:center" | 1997
|style="text-align:center;"|
| 18 || 16 || 5 || 7 || 166 || 229 || 395 || 25 || 50 || 0.3 || 0.4 || 10.4 || 14.3 || 24.7 || 1.6 || 3.1 || 3
|- style="background-color: #EAEAEA"
! scope="row" style="text-align:center" | 1998
|style="text-align:center;"|
| 18 || 5 || 0 || 2 || 29 || 32 || 61 || 9 || 7 || 0.0 || 0.4 || 5.8 || 6.4 || 12.2 || 1.8 || 1.4 || 0
|-
! scope="row" style="text-align:center" | 1999
|style="text-align:center;"|
| 18 || 14 || 2 || 4 || 80 || 148 || 228 || 13 || 22 || 0.1 || 0.3 || 5.7 || 10.6 || 16.3 || 0.9 || 1.6 || 1
|- style="background-color: #EAEAEA"
! scope="row" style="text-align:center" | 2000
|style="text-align:center;"|
| 18 || 12 || 1 || 3 || 69 || 98 || 167 || 12 || 17 || 0.1 || 0.3 || 5.8 || 8.2 || 13.9 || 1.0 || 1.4 || 0
|- class="sortbottom"
! colspan=3| Career
! 219
! 80
! 94
! 2210
! 2719
! 4929
! 405
! 494
! 0.4
! 0.4
! 10.1
! 12.4
! 22.5
! 1.8
! 2.3
! 52
|}

References 

 Hogan P: The Tigers Of Old, Richmond FC, Melbourne 1996

External links
 
 

Richmond Football Club players
Brisbane Bears players
Brisbane Lions players
Victorian State of Origin players
Brisbane Bears Club Champion winners
Jack Dyer Medal winners
All-Australians (AFL)
1968 births
Living people
Australian rules footballers from Victoria (Australia)